"There Must Be an Angel (Playing with My Heart)" is a song by the British musical duo Eurythmics, released as the second single from their fifth studio album, Be Yourself Tonight (1985). It features a harmonica solo by American musician Stevie Wonder. The song became a worldwide success; most notably in Ireland, Norway and the United Kingdom, where it remains the duo's only chart-topper.

The song has been covered by several musical artists, including Brittany Murphy, Fantastic Plastic Machine, Leningrad Cowboys, Luciano Pavarotti, Kylie Minogue, Jessica G. Pilnäs and German girl group No Angels, who obtained their second number-one single in Austria and Germany with their rendition for the reissue of their album Elle'ments in August 2001.

Original version
Upon its release, "There Must Be an Angel (Playing with My Heart)" became Eurythmics' first (and to date only) number-one single in the United Kingdom, reaching number one on 27 July 1985, whilst also topping the charts in Finland, Ireland and Norway. The song also reached the top 10 in Australia, Austria, Belgium, France, Germany, the Netherlands and Sweden, while peaking at number 22 on the US Billboard Hot 100.

Reception
Cash Box said that the "Annie Lennox harmonies, slick Dave Stewart production work and Stevie Wonder's incredible harmonica" were highlights of the song.  Billboard similarly praised Wonder's harmonica bridge and Lennox’s "absolutely happy" lead vocals.

Music video

The music video for "There Must Be an Angel (Playing with My Heart)", directed by Eddie Arno and Mark Innocenti, was shot at New Wimbledon Theatre in London in June 1985. It portrays the times of Louis XIII of France (David A. Stewart) being entertained while watching a theatre performance of singing angels (one of which is played by Steven O'Donnell).

Track listings
7-inch single
A. "There Must Be an Angel (Playing with My Heart)" (7″ edit) - 4:36
B. "Grown Up Girls" - 4:17

12-inch single
A. "There Must Be an Angel (Playing with My Heart)" (LP version) - 5:22
B. "Grown Up Girls" - 4:17

12-inch single (Special Dance Mix)
A. "There Must Be an Angel (Playing with My Heart)" (Special Dance Mix) - 6:20
B. "Grown Up Girls" - 4:17

Credits and personnel

Eurythmics
 Annie Lennox – vocals, keyboards
 David A. Stewart – keyboards

Additional personnel
 Stevie Wonder – harmonica
 Michael Kamen – strings
 Dean Garcia – bass guitar
 Olle Romo – drums
 Richard Cross – backing vocals

Charts

Weekly charts

Year-end charts

Certifications

No Angels version

Recording and release
In mid-2001, producers Patrik Majer, Ulf Leo Sommer, and Rosenstolz member Peter Plate consulted on a contemporary version of the track, recorded by German girl band No Angels. Suggested for re-recording by band manager Joy Behar, the Eurythmics song was one of a couple of tracks considered to be remade by the quintet, but was eventually picked when the producers of the animated feature  agreed to accept the track as film's theme song. "We were speechless and very happy about [the decision]. The animated movie was a world premiere and something really big for us. We immediately said 'yes'," Lucy Diakovska said in an interview. Sandy Mölling noted, that the song was an all-time favourite of the band: "I liked Annie Lennox' voice ever since I can remember." However, in a 2005 interview, Vanessa Petruo revealed her discontent with the song, calling it the "most unnecessary" of all cover versions the band had released between the years of 2001 and 2003.

"There Must Be an Angel" premiered on 9 July 2001, on the RTL Berlin radio network, receiving a positive reception from music critics, and on 17 July 2001 a preview was available on-demand in its entirety on the band's official website. Finally released as the band's third single on 12 August 2001 in German-speaking Europe, the original CD single spawned both an unplugged and an orchestral version, latter featuring music by the Deutsches Filmorchester Babelsberg. The record was subsequently included on the Special Winter Edition reissue of the Elle'ments album (2001). "There Must Be an Angel" was awarded for "Top Single Germany" at the 2001 Top of the Pops Awards.

Commercial performance
The group's first non-album release following "Daylight in Your Eyes" and "Rivers of Joy", the single debuted at number one on the German Singles Chart, staying at the top for five consecutive weeks, 12 weeks in the top 40, and 17 weeks inside the top 60. "There Must Be an Angel" was eventually certified gold by the Bundesverband Musikindustrie (BVMI) for more than 250,000 shipped copies and ranked 13th on the 2001 year-end chart in Germany.

In Austria, the single opened at number eight on the Ö3 Austria Top 40 singles chart. However, it was not until 23 September 2001, the song's fifth week of release, "There Must Be an Angel" eventually climbed to the top spot. It remained another week at number one and spent 21 weeks within the top 60 of the chart, ranking 19th on the Austrian year-end chart in 2001. In Switzerland, the single debuted at number 36 on the Swiss Singles Chart. Benefiting from strong airplay, the song reached number two in its third week of release, becoming No Angels' second highest-charting single there to date. As in Germany, "There Must Be an Angel" was certified gold by the Swiss arm of the International Federation of the Phonographic Industry (IFPI) and ranked 21 on the Swiss year-end chart. In Poland, "There Must Be an Angel" reached number 29 on the Polish Airplay Chart.

Music video

The music video for "There Must Be an Angel" was directed by Jörn Heitmann and filmed near the General-Steinhof-Kaserne at the Gatow Airport in Berlin-Spandau, Germany, on 19 July 2001. Inspired by Tony Scott's 1986 film Top Gun, the clip features the quintet as fighter pilots of the fictional US military squadron 68 at an also-fictional airbase in Angelville, United States. Additionally, it incorporates a 1940s World War II theme, heavily inspired by performances of Marilyn Monroe, The Andrews Sisters and others during their USO shows. Among the aircraft shown in the video are MiG-21s, a B-57 Canberra, an F-104 Starfighter and a Dassault Mystère. "There Must Be an Angel" world premiered in early August 2001 on television, but was temporarily banned from music networks due to its military theme, following the 11 September 2001 attacks.

Track listings

Credits and personnel
Credits adapted from the liner notes of the Special Winter Edition of Elle'ments. 

 Vocals: N. Benaissa, L. Diakovska, S. Mölling, V. Petruo, J. Wahls
 Writers: Patrik Majer, Peter Plate, Ulf Leo Sommer
 Mixing and recording: Patrik "El Pattino" Majer
Mastering: Michael Schwabe

 Keyboards and programming: P. Majer
Additional keyboards: Peter Plate
 Guitars: Peter Weihe
 Strings: The Hamburg Strings

Charts

Weekly charts

Year-end charts

Certifications

Other cover versions
 In 1996, Brittany Murphy covered the song in the television film Double Jeopardy.
 In 1997, Finnish parody rock band Leningrad Cowboys recorded a cover for their 1997 album Mongolian Barbeque.
 In 1998, Fantastic Plastic Machine covered the song on his second album Luxury.
 In 2001, German singer/band leader Max Raabe and Palast Orchester covered the song in cabaret/big band style for his Super Hits album.
 In 2009, Brazilian artist Fernanda Takai included a version for her solo Luz Negra album.
 In 2011, Kylie Minogue covered the song for her Aphrodite Les Folies Tour.
 In 2012, French singer Louisy Joseph covered the song on her second album Ma Radio.

References

1985 songs
1985 singles
1997 singles
2001 singles
Eurythmics songs
Gospel songs
Irish Singles Chart number-one singles
No Angels songs
Number-one singles in Austria
Number-one singles in Finland
Number-one singles in Germany
Number-one singles in Norway
Polydor Records singles
RCA Records singles
Songs written by Annie Lennox
Songs written by David A. Stewart
Song recordings produced by Dave Stewart (musician and producer)
UK Singles Chart number-one singles